Raphitoma raynevali is an extinct species of sea snail, a marine gastropod mollusc in the family Raphitomidae.

Description
The length of the shell reaches 7 mm, its diameter 3 mm.

Distribution
Fossils of this extinct marine species were found in Pliocene strata in Languedoc, France.

References

 Chirli (C.) & Richard (C.), 2008 Les Mollusques plaisanciens de la Côte d’Azur, p. 1-128

External links
 Bellardi L. (1877), I molluschi dei terreni terziarii del Piemonte e della Liguria /

raynevali
Gastropods described in 1877